Outer Ankara is a part of the metropolitan area of Ankara, Turkey.  Of Ankara's 7.1 million people, around 5.4 million live in Outer Ankara. Ankaras metropolitan area is the second largest of Turkey.

Geography of Ankara